Anolis clivicola, the Turquino fern anole or mountain anole, is a species of lizard in the family Dactyloidae. The species is found in Cuba.

References

Anoles
Endemic fauna of Cuba
Reptiles of Cuba
Reptiles described in 1935
Taxa named by Thomas Barbour
Taxa named by Benjamin Shreve